Aspidoscelis danheimae, also known commonly as the Isla San José whiptail, the San Jose Island blue-throated whiptail, and el huico de la Isla San José in Spanish, is a species of lizard in the family Teiidae. The species is endemic to Isla San José in Baja California Sur, Mexico.

Etymology
The specific name, danheimae (genitive, feminine), is in honor of American herpetologist May Danheim Burt, who was the wife of the describer.

Habitat
The preferred natural habitats of A. danheimae are shrubland, rocky areas, and sandy areas, including beach.

Reproduction
A. danheimae is oviparous.

References

Further reading
Burt CE (1929). "The Genus of Teiid Lizards, Verticaria Cope, 1869, Considered as a Synonym of Cnemidophorus Wagler, 1830, with a Key to the Primitive Genera of the Teiidae". Proceedings of the Biological Society of Washington 42: 153–156. (Cnemidophorus hyperythrus danheimae, new name, p. 154).
Grismer LL (1999). "Phylogeny, taxonomy, and biogeography of Cnemidophorus hyperythrus and C. ceralbensis (Squamata: Teiidae) in Baja California, México". Herpetologica 55 (1): 28–42. (Cnemidophorus danheimae, elevated to species status).
Reeder TW, Cole CJ, Dessauer HC (2202). "Phylogenetic Relationships of Whiptail Lizards of the Genus Cnemidophorus (Squamata: Teiidae): A Test of Monophyly, Reevaluation of Karyotypic Evolution, and Review of Hybrid Origins". American Museum Novitates (3365): 1–61. (Aspidoscelis danheimae, new combination, p. 22).
Van Denburgh J (1895). "A Review of the Herpetology of Lower California. Part I—Reptiles". Proceedings of the California Academy of Sciences, Second Series 5: 77–162 + Plates IV–XIV. (Verticaria sericea, new species, pp. 132–133 + Plate XII, figures a–e).

danheimae
Reptiles described in 1929
Taxa named by Charles Earle Burt